Zoltán Latinovits (9 September 1931, in Budapest – 4 June 1976, in Balatonszemes) was a Hungarian actor.

Early life
His mother divorced his father Oszkár Latinovits in 1941 and married István Frenreisz, a medical doctor, with whom she had two more children (István, who became an actor under the name István Bujtor, and musician Károly). He began his school career in 1937, when he was enrolled to the Damjanich Street Primary School in Budapest and graduated with excellent results in 1949 at the Szent Imre Gimnázium (St. Emery College). He became a carpenter and worked for a bridge building firm. He was a basketball player for Haladás SE from 1951 and was also a good sailor. 1956 Architect, Epithetic Faculty, Budapest University of Technology and Economics (Budapesti Műszaki Egyetem), Latinovits finished the university as the best of the year. He was involved in a drama group during his university years.

Acting career
He started his professional acting career after various stints in student and amateur productions and his colleagues and fans talked about him as the King of Actors.

1956-1959. Debrecen, Csokonai Theatre. 
 
1959-1961. Miskolc, National Theatre.

1961-1962. Debrecen, Csokonai Theatre.

1962-1966. Vígszínház (Comedy Theatre). One of his most successful roles performed there was Shakespeare's Romeo and Juliet in 1963, playing with Éva Ruttkai, his later wife.
 
1966-1968. Thália Theatre.
 
1969-1971. Vígszinház.

1971-1976. Veszprém, Petőfi Theatre, where he was able to realise his longtime dream of being able to direct.

One of the best performer of the poetry of Attila József, Gyula Illyés and Endre Ady.

Film career
Performed in numerous films from the late 1950s to the early 1970s. One of the most famous is Szindbád (1971), based on the short stories by Gyula Krúdy and directed by Zoltán Huszárik.

His death
Latinovits was run over by a train at the station of Balatonszemes near Lake Balaton in 1976. Though the official statements talked of suicide, it never became fully clear whether he had jumped deliberately in front of the train or whether his death was an accident. His death immediately became a romanticized legend, also due to the similarities with the suicide of poet Attila József, of whose poems Latinovits had been one of the foremost interpreters.

Selected filmography
 The Man of Gold (1962)
 The Round-Up (1966)
 Stars of Eger (1968)
 Silence and Cry (1968)
 The Lost Generation (1968)
 The Toth Family (1969)
 Szindbád (1971)
 The Pendragon Legend (1974)
 141 Minutes from the Unfinished Sentence (1975)
 The Fifth Seal (1976)
 Trip Around My Cranium (1970)
Számos filmben szerepelt, először 1959-ben a Gyalog a mennyországba címűben.

Gyalog a mennyországba – Imre (1959)
Kertes házak utcája – János (1962)
Az aranyember – Krisztyán Tódor (1962)
Pacsirta – Miklós (1963)
Oldás és kötés – Járom Ambrus dr. (1963)
Fotó Háber – Csiky Gábor (1963)
Az aranyfej (1963)
Karambol – Weber István (1964)
Szegénylegények – Veszelka Imre (1965)
Sellő a pecsétgyűrűn – Borsy Kálmán (1965)
Iszony – Takaró Imre (1965)
Fény a redőny mögött (1965)
Sok hűség semmiért – szobrász (1966)
Az orvos halála – narrátor (1966)
Minden kezdet nehéz (1966)
Egy magyar nábob – Szentirmay Rudolf (1966)
Hideg napok – Büky őrnagy (1966)
És akkor a pasas… – a főnök (1966)
Aranysárkány – Fóris – tanár (1966)
Kárpáthy Zoltán – Szentirmay Rudolf (1966)
Máglyák Firenzében – VI. Sándor pápa (1967) (TV)
Mélyrétegben (1967)
Mocorgó (1967) (TV) – Iric
Tanulmány a nőkről – Balogh Sándor (1967)
Fiúk a térről – Somos doktor (1967)
Egy szerelem három éjszakája – Menyhért (1967)
Ninocska, avagy azok az átkozott férfiak – Vaszilij barátja/utas (1967) (TV)
Csend és kiáltás – Kémeri (1968)
Bánk bán – Bánk bán (1968) (TV)
Kártyavár – Dr. Bán (1968)
Egri csillagok – Varsányi Imre (1968)
Falak – Ambrus László (1968)
Keresztelő – Gócza Menyhért (1968)
A régi nyár – Báró Pataky János (1969) (TV)
A nagy kék jelzés – Abay – költő (1969)
Komédia a tetőn – Géza (1969) (TV)
Hazai pálya – Köves Béla, csapatkapitány (1969)
Az örökös – Geréb Róbert (1969)
Alfa Rómeó és Júlia – Vili (1969)
Kéktiszta szerelem (1969)
Az alvilág professzora – Gálffy alezredes (1969)[19]
Isten hozta, őrnagy úr! – őrnagy (1969)
Utazás a koponyám körül – Karinthy Frigyes, az író (1970)
Szerelmi álmok – herceg (1970)
Az utolsó ítélet (1970) (TV)
Hálóban (1970) (TV)
Szemtől szemben (1970)
Mindannyiotok lelkiismerete megnyugodhat… (1970)
Szindbád – Szindbád (1971)
Bözsi és a többiek (1971) (TV)
Lujzi (1971) (TV)
Csárdáskirálynő – Miska (1971) /a német nyelvű verzióban is/
A legszebb férfikor – Alker Tamás (1972)
Volt egyszer egy család – Géza (1972)
Híres szökések – Le baron de Kempelen (1972) (tévésorozat)
A lámpás – pap (1972)[20]
Harminckét nevem volt (Ságvári Endre emlékfilm)- Juhos csendőrőrnagy (1972)
És mégis mozog a föld – Bálvándy báró (1973)
Trójai nők – Menelaosz (1973) (TV)
III. Richárd (1973) (TV)
A magyar ugaron – Zilahy Kálmán – Tanár (1973)[21]
A dunai hajós – Monsieur Boris (1974)
A Pendragon legenda – Dr. Bátky János (1974)
Kaputt (1974) (TV)
141 perc a befejezetlen mondatból – Wavra tanár (1975)
Az áruló (1975) (TV)
Az öreg – öreg(1975)
Ballagó idő – Huszártiszt (1976)
Az ötödik pecsét – Civilruhás (1976)
Ki látott engem? (1977) (csak hang)

Published books
1973. Ködszurkáló (Skywriter)
1985. Emlékszem a röpülés boldogságára (collected works)

Prizes
(1966) – Jászai Mari prize
(1970) – Balázs Béla prize 
(1975) – Significant artist
(1989) – Kossuth Prize (posth.)
(1970) - Best Actor - Silver Shell - 18th San Sebastian Film Festival

References

External links
 
 

1931 births
1976 suicides
Hungarian male film actors
Suicides in Hungary
Railway accident deaths in Hungary
20th-century Hungarian male actors
1976 deaths